Taj Pabari is a British born - Australian based entrepreneur. He is the chief executive officer of the ASE Group, a social enterprise that helps develop the entrepreneurial skills of school students and young entrepreneurs. Over 100,000 young Australians have participated in their programs.

Pabari was named the 2017 Queensland Young Australian of the Year and The Australian Young Innovator of the Year for 2014. Pabari is best known for his work in youth entrepreneurship and the future of work commentary.

Biography 

Pabari was born in London, England and moved to Brisbane, Australia at the age of one.

He was educated at John Paul College and was frequently suspended during school. He became interested in business and started his first online business age the age of ten.

Pabari launched Fiftysix Creations in 2014 by selling do-it-yourself electronic tablets for kids. In 2016, Fiftysix Creations began running digital literacy programs for indigenous students in Australia. In 2017, Pabari was appointed by Queensland Premier, Annastacia Palaszczuk to the Queensland Plan Ambassadors Council and the Premier’s Anti-Cyberbullying Task Force.

In 2020, Pabari joined the ASE Group as chief executive officer. The organisation delivers education, entrepreneurship and employment programs with the Queensland Government and the Australian Government.

Pabari has appeared as an education commentator on The Today Show, CNBC and the ABC. He has given two TEDx talks and has been a featured speaker at the World Science Festival alongside Nobel laureate, Brian Schmidt.

Awards and nominations 
In 2014, Pabari won The Australian Young Innovator of the Year Award, an award given to the most exciting innovator and emerging talent. The category was presented by then Assistant Treasurer, Senator Arthur Sinodinos in Canberra, Australia. In 2017, Pabari won the Queensland Young Australian of the Year Award in Brisbane, Australia. He is the youngest recipient of the award since its formation in 1979.

In 2020, Pabari was listed in the Courier Mail Logan 50 most influential people list. In 2021, he was listed as one of the 40 Under 40: Most Influential Asian-Australians by Asialink.

References

External links 
 

Living people
Year of birth missing (living people)
Social entrepreneurs
Australian people of Indian descent
Businesspeople from Brisbane
Australian people of Asian descent
People educated at John Paul College (Brisbane)